Greenfield is a village in the civil parish of Saddleworth in the Metropolitan Borough of Oldham, in Greater Manchester, England. It lies in a broad rural area at the southern edge of the South Pennines. To the east of the village Dovestone Reservoir,  Chew Reservoir and Greenfield Reservoir lie in the Peak District National Park.

Historically part of the West Riding of Yorkshire, Greenfield is in the Chew Valley, on the main A635 road from Ashton-under-Lyne to Holmfirth.

History

A Roman road passes along the Saddleworth hills, from the fort of Ardotalia in Glossop to Castleshaw Roman fort. The route of the Roman road passes through Greenfield and crosses Chew Brook at Packhorse Bridge.

The old stone houses of Saddleworth date from the 17th century and were home to farmers and hand loom weavers in the woollen trade. The first industrial looms were also designed and built in Saddleworth. England's highest church 'The Heights' and canal tunnel 'Standedge Tunnel' are also here, the latter dating from the end of the 18th century and being a Thomas Telford project.

The world's first rock climbers' sit harness was invented in Saddleworth in the 1970s, variations of it now forming the basis of almost all the world's climbing sit harnesses.

The poem Jone o Grinfilt was written about a fictional inhabitant of the village with the aim of ridiculing countryside dwellers. The poem was written in the Oldham dialect of English, and was very popular in the 19th century. The author was probably Joseph Lees of Glodwick and it was written in the first decade of the 19th century.

In 1849 the Boarshurst Silver Band was formed as the village band. This brass band is still in existence.website

Governance
Greenfield is in the historic county of Yorkshire and prior to 1974 was administered by the West Riding County Council. In that year governance was transferred to the new Greater Manchester County Council. When that body was abolished in 1986 Greenfield came under the auspices of Oldham Borough Council. Administration under the West Riding County Council led to problems, as Greenfield came under the local administration of Holmfirth for such things as the fire service, despite Holmfirth being significantly further away than Oldham. This was particularly problematic in the winter months, as the roads into the village often become blocked or dangerous due to snow and ice coupled with the village's exposed position on the Pennine moorland.

Geography

Greenfield is at the western end of the Chew Valley in the south west edge of the South Pennines and is fringed by the Peak District to the east. The village contains four reservoirs, three of which are linked to one another: Greenfield, Yeoman Hey and Dovestones. The fourth is Chew Reservoir at the head of Chew Valley, which is the  highest man-made reservoir in England. There is a yachting club on Dovestone Reservoir, the largest of these, and a set of walking paths round the first three. A steep walking path also connects Dovestones to Chew Reservoir. Much of the area covered by the reservoirs lies within the boundary of the Peak District National Park.

Saddleworth Moor rises above Greenfield and leads over impressively barren and disorientating moorlands to Holmfirth. The area includes some of the sites used by Ian Brady and Myra Hindley, known as the 'Moors murders', to bury their child victims in the early to mid 1960s. The sinister nature of the crimes was the subject of a song by the Smiths in 1984.

Greenfield is also the home of an amateur rugby league side, Saddleworth Rangers, as well as Greenfield Cricket Club and Saddleworth Cricket Club. There are two junior and infant schools, and three churches (one Methodist and two Anglican).

Landmarks
Pots and Pans is a locally well-known hill overlooking the village. It is the site of the Saddleworth war memorial (a Grade II listed building), constructed in 1923. A service is held there on Remembrance Sunday each year.

Transport

Rail

Since the Oldham Loop closed, Greenfield is the only place in Saddleworth and the whole Metropolitan Borough of Oldham which has a railway station. Grotton & Springhead, Delph and Grasscroft stations closed in 1955, whilst Diggle and Saddleworth stations closed in 1968. Greenfield railway station lies along the Huddersfield Line with services running towards Huddersfield via Marsden and Slaithwaite and towards Manchester Victoria via Mossley, Stalybridge and Ashton-under-Lyne. A second line, known as the Micklehurst Line, cut through the village and was mainly used for freight. This closed in 1966 and the viaducts were removed in the mid 1970s, the former route now occupied, in the main, by a bridleway.

Bus
The main bus services in Greenfield are run by First Greater Manchester. The terminus in Greenfield, at the Clarence Hotel, runs a half-hourly Monday-Saturday daytime service and hourly evening and Sunday service to Manchester Piccadilly via Oldham. There is also an hourly weekday service (two hourly on a Sunday) to Huddersfield via Diggle.

Culture
Greenfield is one of the towns and villages which holds an annual Whit Friday brass band contest and the annual Road End Fair is held every Maundy Thursday in the centre of the village.

Notable residents
Hervey Rhodes, Baron Rhodes, Lord Lieutenant of Lancashire (from 1968 to 1971) and Deputy-Lord Lieutenant of Greater Manchester in 1974, was from Greenfield. Also Sir W. Cecil Bottomley (mathematician and later Crown Agent for the Colonies), father of Sir James Bottomley (classical scholar and civil servant, and grandfather of Sir Peter Bottomley MP).Sid Cheetham (1946-1979) council superintendent.

See also

Listed buildings in Saddleworth

References

Geography of the Metropolitan Borough of Oldham
Villages in Greater Manchester
Towns and villages of the Peak District
Saddleworth